West Barkwith is a village and civil parish in the East Lindsey district of Lincolnshire, England. The population is included in the civil parish of Benniworth.

West Barkwith and its neighbour East Barkwith were mentioned in Domesday Book of 1086 as one entity and consisted of 26 households and a church.

The parish church was medieval and dedicated to All Saints. The Diocese of Lincoln declared the church redundant in September 1981, and in February 1983 the church was demolished.

References

External links

Civil parishes in Lincolnshire
Villages in Lincolnshire
East Lindsey District